Lajos Szolár (Lajos Szollár; 12 August 1919 – September 24 2005) was a former Hungarian football manager who managed in Poland.

Football

Szolár's first management in football was with Ruch Chorzów in 1960. He took over the position as the club's manager after the sudden death of János Steiner who was managing the team at the time. Szolár left Ruch after 6 months, before becoming Lechia Gdańsk's manager months later. He spent a season with Lechia, managing 25 games in total. With 9 wins he is still Lechia's most successful foreign manager.

References

1919 births
2005 deaths
Lechia Gdańsk managers
Ruch Chorzów managers
Hungarian football managers